Jones v. City of Opelika, 316 U.S. 584 (1942), was a case in which the Supreme Court of the United States held that a statute prohibiting the sale of books without a license was constitutional because it covered not a religious ritual but only individuals who engaged in a commercial activity.

Background 
The city of Opelika, Alabama, charged Jones with violating a statute by selling books without a license. All licenses were subject to immediate revocation by the city without requiring advance notice. Jones, a Jehovah's Witness, alleged that his rights to both freedom of the press and freedom of religion were violated.

Decision

Majority opinion
Writing for the majority, Justice Reed wrote that individual rights must be balanced against competing rights of the state. He asserted that the fact that a person is engaged in disseminating religious materials does not place his action above regulation by the state. When people choose to use the vending of their religious books and tracts as a source of funds, the financial aspects of their transactions need not be wholly disregarded. To subject any religious or didactic group to a reasonable fee for their money-making activities does not require a finding that the licensed acts are purely commercial. It is enough that money is earned by the sale of articles.

When traditional means of distribution are used by religious groups, they can be held to the same standards as non-religious groups. The court held that Jones had no standing to challenge that part of the statute because he did not have a license that was revoked arbitrarily by the state.

Dissenting opinions
The two dissenting opinions, by Chief Justice Harlan Stone and Justice Frank Murphy, examined both the unlimited discretion of the authorities in Opelika to withdraw a license as well as the amount of fees charged in order to get a license. The majority had considered that the amount of fees ($25.00 annually in some cases or $2.50 per day in others) was irrelevant because the issue had not been argued earlier, but the dissenters thought the amount to be relevant.

Effects 

The decision forced religious groups to meet the same requirements as nonreligious groups engaged in a similar activity. The fact that they were selling religious materials did not exempt them from statutes regulating commercial acts.

Subsequent history 

In the one paragraph per curiam decision Jones v. City of Opelika (II), 319 U.S. 103 (1943), the Court vacated Jones v. City of Opelika (1942) on the basis of the principles articulated in Murdock v. Commonwealth of Pennsylvania; a state may not prohibit distribution of religious handbills where handbills seek to raise funds in a lawful fashion.

See also
List of United States Supreme Court cases, volume 316

References

External links

1942 in United States case law
United States free exercise of religion case law
United States Free Speech Clause case law
United States Supreme Court cases
United States Supreme Court cases of the Stone Court
Jehovah's Witnesses litigation in the United States
Lee County, Alabama
Christianity and law in the 20th century
1942 in religion